Jonny Clayton (born 4 October 1974) is a Welsh professional darts player who plays in Professional Darts Corporation (PDC) Events. Nicknamed The Ferret, he was half of the Welsh team that won the 2020 PDC World Cup of Darts before winning his first televised singles title, the 2021 Masters, which would lead him to qualifying for the 2021 Premier League Darts, which he would go on to win as well. He subsequently won his first ranked televised title at the 2021 World Grand Prix.

Career

2015
Clayton joined the PDC Pro Tour in 2015 after winning a Tour Card on the final day of Qualifying School against Jake Strong in a 6-0 whitewash, a result that "Strongy" seems to replicate on many occasions. His first quarter-final came at the sixth Players Championship event and he lost 6–1 to Benito van de Pas.
Clayton qualified for the Grand Slam of Darts later that year, but despite winning his opening match against Terry Jenkins, he went on to finish bottom of his group.

2016
Clayton's first appearance at the UK Open came in the 2016 edition, but he was defeated 6–3 by James Wilson in the second round. Clayton recorded a quarter-final showing at the eighth Players Championship and reached his first semi-final at the 12th event, but was whitewashed 6–0 by Gary Anderson. A 2–0 victory over Tony Darlow saw Clayton claim the non-ranking Worthingtons Darts Champion of Champions title. He lost 6–3 to Darren Webster in round one of the Players Championship Finals.

2017
Clayton made his PDC World Championship debut in the 2017 event, and came from a set down to beat fellow Welshman Gerwyn Price 3–1 in the first round. He lost 4–1 to Ian White in the second round.

Clayton won his first PDC ranking title with Players Championship 22 after beating James Wilson 6-1 in the final.

Clayton got to his first PDC major final at the 2017 Players Championship Finals. He beat Jeffrey de Graaf, Price, Stephen Bunting, Steve Beaton and number 1 seed Rob Cross, before losing out to Michael van Gerwen.

2018
His run to the final saw him break into the top 32 of the PDC Order of Merit, meaning that he was a seed at the 2018 PDC World Darts Championship, where he was eliminated by fellow countryman Jamie Lewis.

He went on to win the 2018 Austrian Darts Open by defeating Gerwyn Price 8-5 in the final. This meant that he was the first welsh winner on the PDC European tour.

2019
Clayton won Players Championship 10 by defeating Gabriel Clemens 8-4 in the final. This was Jonny's 3rd ranking title.

2020: World Cup Champion
At this point a three-time PDC ranking title winner, Clayton was selected as a 'challenger' for the 2020 Premier League night in Cardiff, but lost 7–1 to an inspired Michael Smith.

Clayton kicked off his 2020 season by defeating world number one Michael van Gerwen 10-6 in the opening round of the 2020 Masters.

He went on to win the 2020 PDC World Cup of Darts for Wales with Gerwyn Price as his teammate, defeating the English side of Rob Cross and Michael Smith 3-0.

2021: First individual title, Premier League and Grand Prix champion

At the Masters Clayton beat José de Sousa, Michael van Gerwen, James Wade and Peter Wright en route to the final where he faced Mervyn King. Clayton won the match 11–8 to win his first major individual televised title. In his match against Wade, he was successful in checking out 10 times out of 11 for a success rate of 91%, which the PDC claimed to be a possible world record.

He won two Players Championship events early in 2021.

Upon winning the Masters tournament, Clayton was invited to participate in the 2021 Premier League Darts, where on the third night of his debut season he hit a nine-dart finish on the way to beating José de Sousa.

After the fifth evening of league action Clayton was placed at the top of the league. He slipped to as low as 8th, before going into 4th position for night 16. He had to achieve at least a draw to secure his place in the playoffs. He managed to do so and won his game against Dimitri Van den Bergh winning 8–6.

In the playoffs he beat Michael van Gerwen 10–8 in their semi-final. He went on to defeat José de Sousa 11–5 in the final. In doing so he became the first Welsh winner of the Premier League and the first player to finish 4th in the league phase and win the title.

Clayton participated in the World Grand Prix in which he reached the final after beating Callan Rydz, José de Sousa, Krzysztof Ratajski and Danny Noppert along the way. In the final Clayton prevailed over World No. 1 Gerwyn Price with a 5–1 victory winning him his third major tournament of the year. Three weeks later, Clayton picked up his fourth TV title of the year with an 11–6 victory over Dimitri Van den Bergh in the final of the World Series of Darts Finals.

2022
At the 2022 World Championship, Clayton defeated Keane Barry and Gabriel Clemens before losing to eventual finalist Michael Smith 4–3.

2023
At the 2023 World Championship, Clayton beat Josh Rock 4–3 to reach the quarter finals for the first time in his career.

World Championship performances

PDC
 2017: Second round (lost to Ian White 1–4)
 2018: First round (lost to Jamie Lewis 0–3)
 2019: Second round (lost to Dimitri Van den Bergh 1–3)
 2020: Third round (lost to Stephen Bunting 0–4)
 2021: Third round (lost to Joe Cullen 3–4)
 2022: Fourth round (lost to Michael Smith 3–4)
 2023: Quarter-finals (lost to Dimitri Van den Bergh 3–5)

Career finals

PDC major finals: 5 (4 titles, 1 runner-up)

PDC team finals: 2 (1 title, 1 runner-up)

PDC World Series finals: 1 (1 title, 1 runner-up)

Career statistics

(W) Won; (F) finalist; (SF) semifinalist; (QF) quarterfinalist; (#R) rounds 6, 5, 4, 3, 2, 1; (RR) round-robin stage; (Prel.) Preliminary round; (DNQ) Did not qualify; (DNP) Did not participate; (NH) Not held; (WD) Withdrew

Performance timeline

PDC European Tour

Nine-dart finishes

References

External links

1974 births
Living people
Welsh darts players
Sportspeople from Llanelli
Professional Darts Corporation current tour card holders
PDC World Cup of Darts Welsh championship team
Masters (darts) champions
Premier League Darts champions
World Grand Prix (darts) champions
World Series of Darts winners
Darts players who have thrown televised nine-dart games